Noise & Health is a bimonthly peer-reviewed open access medical journal published by Medknow Publications on behalf of the Noise Research Network. It publishes articles on the subject of auditory and non-auditory effects of occupational, environmental, and leisure noise.

Abstracting and indexing 
The journal is abstracted and indexed in Abstracts on Hygiene and Communicable Diseases, Caspur, EBSCO databases, EmCare, Excerpta Medica/EMBASE, Expanded Academic ASAP, MEDLINE/Index Medicus, ProQuest, SafetyLit, Scopus, and Tropical Diseases Bulletin. According to the Journal Citation Reports, the journal has a 2016 impact factor of 1.798.

See also 
 Health effects from noise
 Noise pollution

References

External links 
 

Occupational safety and health journals
Open access journals
Quarterly journals
English-language journals
Environmental health journals
Medknow Publications academic journals
Publications established in 1999
Noise pollution